Tom Norris (born 1971) is an English musician, composer, ensemble leader and songwriter, who plays classical violin with the London Symphony Orchestra and also manages a solo pop music career.

Life
Tom Norris was born in Kent and attended Chetham's School of Music as a child. Later he studied at the Guildhall School of Music and Drama in London, and began singing and playing in local clubs as a jazz violinist with musicians including Lionel Grigson. After finishing school, he played as an extra with the London Symphony Orchestra, began to write songs and toured in a piano trio with Norbert Zehm and Kate Shortt. He continued his studies at Banff Centre for the Arts in Alberta, Canada, and then took a position for two years as Principal Second Violinist with the Winnipeg Symphony Orchestra. He returned to London for a position with the London Symphony Orchestra, where he plays Co-Principal Second Violin.

Norris has worked with a broad range of musical acts including The Who, Eric Clapton, Antony and the Johnsons, John Adams, Deep Purple, Manu Delago, Seal, Dave Brubeck, Elvis Costello, Daniel Barenboim, Bernard Haitink and Pierre Boulez. In March 2010, Norris played violin for The Who's production of Quadrophenia at the Royal Albert Hall in London as a tenth anniversary charity benefit for the Teenage Cancer Trust. On 3 July 2010, he performed as the opening act for Eric Clapton at DTE Energy music theatre.

Norris leads the Vuillaume Quartet, formed in 2001 for the London Symphony Orchestra's Discovery program. In August 2010, his classical ensemble The Puertas Quartet reached the semi-finals of the Bordeaux International String Quartet Competition.

Discography

Norris maintains a broad discography, having appeared on numerous CDs as a musician, composer and/or ensemble leader. In 2010 he debuted as a solo recording artist, issuing his first popular music CD, Edge of the World.

Other credits include:
Various Artists, Radio Disney Jams, Vol. 12, composer
Various Artists, Family Jams, Vol. 3, composer
RPWL, Gentle Art of Music, String Arrangements
RPWL, Gentle Art of Music, Viola
Various Artists, It's Teen Disney, composer
RPWL, Gentle Art of Music, Violin
Escala, Escala, Violin
Declan, Declan, leader
Johan de Meij, Johan de Meij: Symphony No. 1 "Lord of the Rings", Violin
Mannheim Steamroller, Fresh Aire Collector's Box, Vol. 1–8, Violin
Mannheim Steamroller, Fresh Aire 8, Violin
Various Artists, Music of Hope, Violin
Chris Brubeck, Bach to Brubeck: Bass Trombone Concerto/Blues Suite for Banjo & Orchestra, Violin
Nanci Griffith, Dust Bowl Symphony, Violin
Shinjuku Thief, "Witch Hammer'', Feedback

References

External links
"Vienna" music video
Official website
Youtube music channel
The Puertas Quartet
Tom Norris plays Quadrophenia with The Who
Interview for "The Gentle Art of Music"

1971 births
Living people
English classical violinists
British male violinists
British jazz violinists
English composers
English male singer-songwriters
Musicians from London
English male guitarists
Musicians from Kent
21st-century English singers
21st-century classical violinists
21st-century British guitarists
21st-century British male singers
British male jazz musicians
Male classical violinists